The Hausberg is a mountain with an elevation of 486 m next to Butzbach in Hesse, Germany. It is part of the Taunus mountain range and located at its easternmost part bordering the fertile landscape of the Wetterau, which is of a much lower altitude. Therefore, the mountain is well situated for look-out and in 1873 a first look-out tower was erected on its top. In 1875 a storm damaged the tower severely, but it was repaired in the following year and remained in use until 1941 when it was demolished due to being in disrepair. More than 60 years later in June 2007 the construction of a new tower started and was completed in May 2008. The new tower has a total height of 23 m and a roofed observation deck at 19 m.

The Hausberg and its neighbouring Brülerberg were the site of an ancient Celtic ringfort from the La Tène period. The excavation and research of its remains started in 1911. In the neighbourhood there are also remains from the Roman period. The Limes Germanicus traverses through the foothills of the Hausberg and one of its smaller forts the Hunnenkirchhof is located close to the mountain.

References 
 Fritz-Rudolf Herrmann: Die Ringwälle auf dem Hausberg bei Butzbach. In: Fundberichte aus Hessen Beiheft 1 – Festschrift W. Dehn, Bonn 1969 pp. 58–68 (also in: Wetterauer Geschichtsblätter 19, 1970, pp. 1–9).
Eine Sicht auf alte Ringwälle. Ein Aussichtsturm für den Hausberg bei Butzbach – copy of FAZ article of 2008-5-26 (page 50; PDF file; 19 kB)
Hausberg on a website of Butzbach
website of the look-out tower club containing historic infos and pictures
Von keltischen Burgen und nicht vorhandenen Schlössern – description of the Hausbergs and its surroundings

External links

Hills of Hesse
Mountains and hills of the Taunus